Gongylosciadium is a genus of flowering plants belonging to the family Apiaceae.

Its native range is Turkey to Iran.

Species:
 Gongylosciadium falcarioides (Bornm. & H.Wolff) Rech.f.

References

Apioideae
Apioideae genera